Jody David Scheckter (born 29 January 1950) is a South African business proprietor and former motor racing driver. Scheckter remains the only African driver to win the Formula One World Championship.

Career

Scheckter was born in East London, Eastern Cape, and educated at Selborne College and Hudson Park High School.

Formula One

He rapidly ascended to the ranks of Formula One after moving to Britain in 1970. His Formula 1 debut occurred at the US Grand Prix at Watkins Glen in 1972 with McLaren, where he ran as high as third place before spinning and finishing ninth. Immediately becoming a name to watch, he continued his development the following year, winning the 1973 SCCA L&M Championship and racing five times in F1.  In France, he almost won in only his third start in F1 before crashing into Emerson Fittipaldi, the reigning World Champion, who said after the crash about Scheckter: "This madman is a menace to himself and everybody else and does not belong in Formula 1." In his next start, the British Grand Prix at Silverstone, Scheckter's spin triggered a major accident which took nearly a dozen cars out of the race.  The Grand Prix Drivers Association demanded his immediate banishment, which was only put off when McLaren agreed to rest their driver for four races. Scheckter's McLaren M23 bore the number zero during the Canadian and American Grands Prix of 1973.  Scheckter is one of only two F1 drivers to compete under this number, the other being Damon Hill. During the practice for the American event at the Watkins Glen circuit, Frenchman François Cevert, who was due to be Scheckter's Tyrrell teammate for 1974, was killed in an appalling accident at the fast uphill Esses corners. Scheckter was behind Cevert when he crashed, and he stopped his McLaren, got out of his car and attempted to help Cevert out of his destroyed Tyrrell, but the 29-year-old Frenchman had been cut in half by the circuit's poorly installed Armco barriers and was already dead. Witnessing Cevert's dreadful accident left an indelible mark on the South African and caused him to abandon his reckless ways, becoming a more mature and calculating driver as a result.

Tyrrell in 1974 gave Scheckter his first full-time drive in F1 and he rewarded them with a third-place finish in the Drivers' Championship and a pair of wins in Sweden and Britain. During the year, he scored points in eight consecutive races, one of the longer scoring streaks of the time. A slight off-year followed, although he did become the only South African to win the South African Grand Prix, but his third year with the team in 1976 gave him another third-place finish in the Drivers' Championship. In that season, Tyrrell introduced the most radical car in F1 history, the innovative six-wheeled Tyrrell P34. Although he later went on record as saying the car was "a piece of junk", Scheckter gave the six-wheeler its only win on Sweden's Anderstorp circuit and in his twelve races with the car, he scored points ten times. This included a thrilling race-long battle for the lead in the American Grand Prix between himself and his great friend James Hunt.
Scheckter left for Walter Wolf's new team in 1977 and Scheckter gave the team a win in its maiden race. He won twice more with the team and was often on the podium, but finished second on points behind a more dominant Niki Lauda. A seventh-place finish with the team in 1978 followed and he left the team after the season to join Ferrari to partner Gilles Villeneuve in the team's ground effect 312T4 car.Critics felt he would not get along well with the domineering management at Ferrari, but he far surpassed expectations and helped give F1's most recognisable team another Constructors' Championship, while Scheckter's consistent finishes, with three wins among them, gave him the Drivers' Championship in 1979. However, he struggled badly in his 1980 title defence, even failing to qualify for one race. After managing only two points, Scheckter announced his retirement from the team and the sport.

After Formula One

Broadcaster

In 1981, CBS Sports hired Scheckter as a Pit reporter for its F1 coverage.

Scheckter was brought in by ABC's Wide World Of Sports  as a Pit reporter for the 1983 Monaco Grand Prix.

Scheckter was a guest commentator for ITV during the 1999 San Marino Grand Prix, replacing Martin Brundle.

Other interests

In 1981, Scheckter won the World Superstars competition in Key Biscayne, Florida.  He defeated athletes such as Russ Francis, Renaldo Nehemiah, Peter Müller, Rick Barry, Gaétan Boucher and Andy Ripley.  In 1983, he was inducted into the International Jewish Sports Hall of Fame.

After Scheckter's retirement, he founded FATS Inc, a company which built firearms training simulators for military, law enforcement and security organisations. The sale of the company provided funds to allow Scheckter to help the racing careers of his sons Tomas and Toby.  Tomas raced in the Indy Racing League where he won two races. Scheckter's brother, Ian, also raced in F1 for a few years.

In 2004, Scheckter was reunited with his championship-winning Ferrari at the South African two-seater F1x2 Charity Grand Prix at Kyalami in South Africa.

Present

As an organic farming expert, Scheckter was featured in 2005 on the Visionhealth DVD and TV documentaries "Asthma: An Integrated Approach", "Arthritis: An Integrated Approach" and "Diabetes: An Integrated Approach". On 20 November 2011, he also appeared on the Countryfile television show to make a case for organic food. Laverstoke Park Farm was also featured on BBC's Escape To the Country where Scheckter showed viewers how Buffalo Mozzarella was made. In December 2009, Scheckter announced his intention to produce a biodynamic sparkling wine by 2012. In 2015, the farm was the setting for ITV's Sugar Free Farm where a group of celebrities had to go sugar free for two weeks whilst working on the farm.

Personal life

He is married and has had six children: two, Toby and Tomas, from his previous wife Pamela; and four, Hugo, Freddie, Ila and Poppy, from his current marriage to Clare.

His daughter Ila died on 17 October 2019, at age 21.

Racing record

Career summary

Complete Formula One World Championship results

(key) (Races in bold indicate pole position; races in italics indicate fastest lap)

Formula One non-championship results

(key) (Races in bold indicate pole position)
(Races in italics indicate fastest lap)

See also

List of select Jewish racing drivers

References

1950 births
Living people
Sportspeople from East London, Eastern Cape
South African Jews
White South African people
South African racing drivers
South African Formula One drivers
Ferrari Formula One drivers
McLaren Formula One drivers
Tyrrell Formula One drivers
Wolf Formula One drivers
Formula One World Drivers' Champions
Formula One race winners
European Formula Two Championship drivers
International Race of Champions drivers
Alumni of Selborne College
South African businesspeople
South African farmers
Formula Ford drivers 
People from Overton, Hampshire